The 2000 Vermont gubernatorial election took place on November 7, 2000. Incumbent Democratic Governor Howard Dean won re-election. The campaign was dominated by the fallout from the passage of a civil union bill and the subsequent backlash encapsulated by the slogan Take Back Vermont. Ruth Dwyer, the Republican nominee in 1998, ran again in 2000 and was closely tied to the Take Back Vermont movement. Howard Dean, the Democratic governor, favored civil unions and was a primary target of Take Back Vermont.

Democratic primary

Candidates
 Howard Dean, incumbent Governor of Vermont
 Brian Pearl

Results

Republican primary

Candidates
 Ruth Dwyer, former State Representative and nominee for Governor in 1998
 William Meub, attorney

Results

General election
Progressive Anthony Pollina's candidacy nearly succeeded in holding Dean to less than 50 percent, which would have required the Vermont General Assembly to choose a winner.  In such races, the joint meeting of the Vermont House and Senate almost always chooses the candidate who received the highest number of votes, but Republicans took control of the Vermont House in 2001, which might have resulted in a contested election.

Debates
Complete video of debate, September 24, 2000

Results

See also
 2000 United States Senate election in Vermont
 2000 United States House of Representatives election in Vermont
 2000 United States presidential election in Vermont

References

Vermont
2000
Gubernatorial
Howard Dean